Election to legislative assembly constituencies of Uttar Pradesh is held every five years and conducted by Election commission of India whereas the election to local bodies of Uttar pradesh is conducted by the Election Commission of Uttar pradesh. Parliamentary constituencies and Legislative assembly constituencies are also called "Lok sabha seats" and "Vidhan sabha seats" respectively. There are 80 parliamentary constituencies and 403 legislative assembly constituency in Uttar Pradesh. The state has seen 17 Vidhan Sabha elections and 16 Lok Sabha elections since independence.

In India, elections to parliamentary constituencies and legislative assembly constituencies are conducted by Election Commission of India and elections to local bodies are conducted by the election commission of the respective state. It is the Election Commission of India who decides the delimitation (the redrawing of the boundaries of parliamentary or assembly constituencies to make sure that there are, as nearly as practicable, the same number of people in each constituency), reservation of seats and system of election with respect to parliamentary and assembly constituency elections.

Vidhan Sabha elections

Uttar Pradesh has 403 assembly constituencies. The Chief Minister of the state is elected by legislators of the political party or coalition commanding an assembly majority, and serves a five-year term with a provision of re-election. The Governor is the head of state, but his or her role is largely ceremonial.

List of legislative assembly constituencies 
Every parliamentary constituency is composed of multiple state assembly constituencies. And electoral boundaries are different from administrative boundaries. For instance, electoral boundary of Agra parliamentary constituency is different from the district (administrative) boundary of Agra.
Main: List of Assembly constituencies of Uttar Pradesh

List of legislative assembly elections 

 Simple Text based data from the above table. 
 1967 : Total : 425; Congress 199, Jana Sangh 98. Chandra Bhanu Gupt became CM for 14 days, but his Congress Party split. And Charan Singh (Lok Dal / Kranti Dal) replaced him.
 1969 : Congress 211/425, Bahujan Kranti Dal (Charan Singh) 98, Jana Sangh 49
 1974 : Congress 215, Kranti Dal 106, Jana Sangh 61
 1977 : Janata Party 352, Congress 47
 1980 : Congress 309, Janata Party 4, Janata Party (Charan Singh) 59, BJP 11 .
 1985 : Congress 269, Lok Dal 84, Janata Party 20, BJP 16.
 1990 : Janata Dal 208, BJP 57, Congress 94
 1991 : BJP 221 (Kalyan Singh), Janata Dal 92, BSP 12
 December 1992 to December 1993 : President's rule, following demolition of Babri Masjid in Ayodhya
 1993 : Total seats 425.  SP 109 + BSP 67 (176), BJP : 177, Cong, 28: Janata : 27 .  (CM - Mulayam, Mayawati) 
 October 1995 to March 1997 - unusually long President's rule with no formation able to claim majority
 1997 : BJP - 174/425, BSP - 67, SP - 110, Congress - 33.  (CM - Mayawati, Kalyan Singh, Ram Prakash Gupta, Rajnath Singh)
 2002 : Samajwadi Party : 143/403, BSP : 98, BJP : 88, Congress 25, Ajit Singh RLD 14. (CMs : Mayawati 2002-05-03 (3 May) to 2003-08-29, later Mulayam Singh Aug 2003 to May 2007)
 2007 : BSP 206/403, BJP 51, Samajwadi 97. CM : Mayawati.
 2012 : Total - 403.  SP - 224, BSP : 80, BJP : 47, Congress : 28.  (CM - Akhilesh)
 2017 : Total seats 403.  BJP : 312, Apna Dal : 9, SBSP : 4, Samajwadi Party : 47, BSP : 19, Congress : 7 .  (CM - Adityanath)
 2022 : Total seats 403.  BJP : 255, Apna Dal : 12, NISHAD : 6, Samajwadi Party : 111, RLD : 8, SBSP : 6, BSP : 1, Congress : 2 .  (CM - Adityanath)

Partywise After 2000
Total Seats- 403

Lok Sabha elections 

The Lok Sabha is the directly elected lower house of the Parliament of India. As of 2019 there have been seventeen Lok Sabhas elected by the people of India. Uttar Pradesh has 80 Lok Sabha constituencies.

List of Constituencies

Partywise results

Table of UP Lok Sabha results

See also

 List Uttar Pradesh Legislative Assembly elections

References

External links
Election Commission of India
Information About Uttar Pradesh Elections